Cynthia Lima Falabella (born January 19, 1972 in Belo Horizonte, Brazil) is a Brazilian actress. Daughter of actor Rogério Falabella and singer Maria Olympia, she is the sister of actress Débora Falabella.

Biography 

In 2002, it took about four minutes on the video kicking and screaming as he left the scene to load that Cynthia could get more recognition than hitherto in the nine-year career in the theater. Call to replace her younger sister, Débora Falabella of O Clone to Mel, who spent one week at a hospital treating meningitis, Cynthia took the job.

That was not the first time the two exchanged paper. Deborah has already replaced her sister at the theater in 1998 as Dorothy Gale from The Wizard of Oz, no one in the audience noticing.

On television, Cynthia also participated in the América novel of 2005 is Tempo Final in 2008.

In cinema, the work of Cynthia were in O Quintal dos Guerrilheiros, short film, 2005; Os 12 Trabalhos (2006), Batismo de Sangue (2006) is 5 Frações de Uma Quase História (2007).

In 2008, she is his sister share the stage in The Serpent, last play written by playwright Nelson Rodrigues.

In 2010, returns to the television series A Vida Alheia of Rede Globo, the same year was Chico Xavier is in the movie was the play TOC TOC (2010/2011). Later that same year she signed with the SBT to act in the novel Corações Feridos, that this novel shelved.

In 2011, the pileup of the novel Corações Feridos, Cynthia back to Rede Globo's soap opera Aquele Beijo.

Filmography

Television

Film

Theater

Awards

References

External links 

1972 births
Living people
People from Belo Horizonte
People from Minas Gerais
Brazilian television actresses
Brazilian telenovela actresses
Brazilian film actresses
Brazilian stage actresses